The flag of the Karakalpak Autonomous Soviet Socialist Republic was adopted in 1954 by the government of the Karakalpak Autonomous Soviet Socialist Republic. The flag is identical to the flag of the Uzbek Soviet Socialist Republic. The former Karakalpak ASSR had its own flag from 1934 to its dissolution in 1992, which developed similarly to that of the Uzbek SSR. Basic design of the flag was always a red cloth with inscription.

History

First version 
The 2nd Congress of Soviets of the Karakalpak Autonomous Soviet Socialist Republic from 21 until 25 December 1934 adopted the Constitution of the Karakalpak ASSR. The flag of the Karakalpak ASSR was described in the Article 109 of the constitution.

Second version 
On December 5, 1936, the Karakalpak ASSR became part of the Uzbek SSR. The new state symbols was approved in the Constitution, adopted by the 3rd Extraordinary Congress of Soviets of the Karakalpak Autonomous Soviet Socialist Republic in October 1936, and approved by the Presidium of the Central Executive Committee of the Uzbek SSR on September 29, 1937. The flag of the Karakalpak ASSR was described in the Article 111 of the constitution.

Revision 
In accordance with the official change of the writing system of the Uzbek language on 8 May 1940.

Gallery

References

Citations

Bibliography

Constitutions

Books 

Karakalpak Autonomous Soviet Socialist Republic
Flags introduced in 1954
Karakalpakstan